Acrobasis repandana is a moth of the family Pyralidae. It is found in Europe.

The wingspan is 20–25 mm. The moth flies from June to August depending on the location.

The larvae feed on oak.

References

External links 
 Microplepidoptera.nl 
 Lepidoptera of Belgium
 UKMoths

Moths described in 1798
Acrobasis
Moths of Europe